Sergio Damián Barreto (born 20 April 1999) is an Argentine professional footballer who plays as a centre-back for Argentine Primera División side Independiente.

Career
After joining Independiente in 2008, Barreto was promoted into the club's first-team squad in 2017. He made his debut on 9 December by playing the full ninety minutes in a victory away to Arsenal de Sarandí.

Career statistics
.

References

External links

1999 births
Living people
People from Formosa, Argentina
Argentine sportspeople of Paraguayan descent
Argentine footballers
Association football defenders
Argentine Primera División players
Club Atlético Independiente footballers